{{Infobox election
|election_name = United States Soccer Federation presidential election, 2018
| logo = 
|type = presidential
|vote_type = Caucus
|ongoing = No
|previous_election =
|previous_year =  2014
|next_election = 
|next_year = 
|election_date = February 10, 2018
|image1 =
|candidate1 = Carlos Cordeiro
|color1 = 
|popular_vote1=
|percentage1 = 68.6
|image2 = 
|candidate2 = Kathy Carter
|color2 = 
|popular_vote2 =
|percentage2 = 10.6
|image3 = 
|candidate3 = Kyle Martino
|color3 = 
|popular_vote3 = 
|percentage3 = 10.6
|image4= 
|candidate4 = Eric Wynalda
|color4 = 
|popular_vote4 = 
|percentage4 = 8.9
|title = President
|before_election = Sunil Gulati
|after_election = Carlos Cordeiro
}}

The 2018 United States Soccer Federation presidential election was held in February 2018 to determine the next President of the United States Soccer Federation. Having served as President since 2006, incumbent Sunil Gulati decided not to run for re-election, after the United States men's national soccer team failed to qualify for the FIFA World Cup for the first time since 1986.

 Background 
Sunil Gulati, the incumbent president of U.S. Soccer, has held the position since he was first elected in 2006. Gulati ran unopposed for election in 2006, and for re-election in 2010 and 2014. On December 4, 2017, Gulati announced that he would not seek another term.

In the months leading up to the election, the U.S. Soccer Federation submitted a joint bid with Canada and Mexico to host the 2026 FIFA World Cup. In October 2017, the United States men's national soccer team failed to qualify for the 2018 FIFA World Cup, missing the World Cup for the first time since 1986, sparking a major push for reform by supporters.

Format
The election took place on February 10, 2018, at the National Council Meeting during the U.S. Soccer Annual Meeting in Orlando, Florida. Candidates are required to pass a background check conducted by the federation and receive three letters of nomination from organization members or an athlete representative on the federation's Board of Directors.

Eligible delegates will be drawn from the following groups:

The 91 state-level associations, national associations, and professional leagues
Voting members of the Athletes Council
Voting members of the Board of Directors
Past presidents of the federation
Life Members
Delegates from national associations, national affiliates, other affiliates, and disabled service organizations
Delegates selected by individual sustaining members

Votes are divided between the Athletes Council, Youth Council, Adult Council, Professional Council, and other groups.

 General election campaign 
On December 22, 2017, Grant Wahl of Sports Illustrated reported that outgoing U.S. Soccer President, Sunil Gulati and Major League Soccer commissioner, Don Garber were campaigning for, and hosted a campaign dinner for Kathy Carter. This sparked a potential conflict of interest given Carter's current role with Soccer United Marketing, and SUM's relationship with U.S. Soccer and MLS. Carter denied any collusion between her, Gulati and Garber.

Shortly after, Carter received the endorsement from the Eastern New York State Soccer Association (ENYSSA) and the New Jersey Soccer Association (NJSA). When asked on Twitter about the decision-making process to endorse Carter, the ENYSSA blocked several accounts on Twitter, only to revert the blocks and claiming their account was "hacked".

 Candidates 
On December 20, 2017, USSF announced that eight candidates were eligible to stand for election, having met the federation's requirements, 8 of 9 opposed Sunil Gulati. Of the nine declared candidates, only Paul Lapointe failed to qualify for the ballot since he supported Sunil Gulati.

 Confirmed 
 Paul Caligiuri, former player of the US national team
 Kathy Carter, former college player and president of Soccer United Marketing
 Carlos Cordeiro, USSF vice president since 2016 and member of CONCACAF Council
 Steve Gans, attorney based in Boston
 Kyle Martino, former player of the US national team, TV analyst
 Hope Solo, former player of the US women's national team, World Cup champion
 Michael Winograd, lawyer and former professional player and general manager in the A-League
 Eric Wynalda, former player of the US national team, analyst for Fox Sports 1/FOX Sports and former head coach

 Failed to Qualify 
 Paul Lapointe, Massachusetts regional director of United Premier Soccer League and former commissioner/owner of the American Indoor Soccer League

 Declined 
 Rocco Commisso, owner of the New York Cosmos
 Joe Cummings, former head of National Soccer Coaches Association of America, now United Soccer Coaches
 Landon Donovan, former player of the US national team
 Brad Friedel, head coach of the New England Revolution and former head coach of the United States men's national under-19 soccer team
 Julie Foudy, former USWNT captain, former president of Women's Sports Foundation, current journalist for ESPN
 Sunil Gulati, incumbent
 Angela Hucles, member of U.S. Soccer Athletes Council, former president of Women's Sports Foundation
 Mia Hamm, former USWNT player, part-owner of Los Angeles FC
 Claudio Reyna, sporting director of New York City FC
 Nelson Rodriguez, general manager of Chicago Fire
 Rishi Sehgal, interim commissioner of the North American Soccer League
 Charlie Stillitano, director of the International Champions Cup

 Endorsements 

ResultsFirst ballotCarlos Cordeiro – 36.3%
Kathy Carter – 34.6%
Eric Wynalda – 13.7%
Kyle Martino – 8.6%
Steve Gans – 4.1%
Hope Solo – 1.6%
 Michael Winograd – 0.6%
Paul Caligiuri – 0.5%
 Paul Caligiuri – withdrewSecond ballotCarlos Cordeiro – 41.8%
Kathy Carter – 33.3%
Eric Wynalda – 10.8%
Kyle Martino – 10.2%
Steve Gans – 2.4%
Hope Solo – 1.5%
Michael Winograd – 0.0%
 Michael Winograd and Steve Gans withdrewThird ballot'''
Carlos Cordeiro – 68.6%
Kathy Carter – 10.6%
Kyle Martino – 10.6%
Eric Wynalda – 8.9%
Hope Solo – 1.4%
 Carlos Cordeiro elected

References

Presidents of the United States Soccer Federation
2018 in American soccer